The 1915 Boston Red Sox season was the 15th season in the franchise's Major League Baseball history. The Red Sox finished first in the American League (AL) with a record of 101 wins and 50 losses.

The team then faced the National League (NL) champion Philadelphia Phillies in the 1915 World Series, which the Red Sox won in five games to capture the franchise's third World Series. While the Red Sox' home field was Fenway Park, their two home games of the World Series were played at Braves Field, due to its larger seating capacity.

Regular season

Opening Day lineup

Source:

Season standings

Record vs. opponents

Roster

Player stats

Batting

Starters by position
Note: Pos = Position; G = Games played; AB = At bats; H = Hits; Avg. = Batting average; HR = Home runs; RBI = Runs batted in

Other batters
Note: G = Games played; AB = At bats; H = Hits; Avg. = Batting average; HR = Home runs; RBI = Runs batted in

Pitching

Starting pitchers
Note: G = Games pitched; IP = Innings pitched; W = Wins; L = Losses; ERA = Earned run average; SO = Strikeouts

Other pitchers
Note: G = Games pitched; IP = Innings pitched; W = Wins; L = Losses; ERA = Earned run average; SO = Strikeouts

Relief pitchers
Note: G = Games pitched; W = Wins; L = Losses; SV = Saves; ERA = Earned run average; SO = Strikeouts

1915 World Series 

AL Boston Red Sox (4) vs. NL Philadelphia Phillies (1)

References

External links
1915 Boston Red Sox team page at Baseball Reference
1915 Boston Red Sox season at baseball-almanac.com

Boston Red Sox seasons
Boston Red Sox
Boston Red Sox
1910s in Boston
American League champion seasons
World Series champion seasons